Exequiel Alejandro Palacios (born 5 October 1998) is an Argentine professional footballer who plays as a midfielder for Bundesliga club Bayer Leverkusen and the Argentina national team.

Club career
Palacios is a youth exponent from Club Atlético River Plate. He made his league debut on 8 November 2015 against Newell's Old Boys.

Palacios made his final appearance for his boyhood club in the final of the Copa Argentina on 13 December 2019, playing 79 minutes of a 3–0 victory over Central Córdoba.

Bayer Leverkusen 
On 16 December 2019, Bayer Leverkusen announced that Palacios would join the club on 1 January 2020, signing a five-and-a-half year deal.

International career
Palacios made his international debut for Argentina on 8 September 2018 in a 3–0 international friendly against the Guatemala national football team.

On 12 November 2020, Palacios fractured a bone in his spine during a 1–1 draw with Paraguay in a World Cup qualifier and was expected be out for three months. Palacios sustained the injury in an aerial duel with Angel Romero in the first half of the contest at La Bombonera and was replaced by Giovani Lo Celso, who took the corner from which Nicolas Gonzalez headed home Argentina's equaliser.

On 10 July 2021, Palacios appeared in Argentina's 1-0 victory over Brazil in winning the CONMEBOL Copa America.

On 18 December 2022, Palacios was an unused substitute in Argentina's victory over France in the final of the 2022 Fifa World Cup.  Palacios came on in the 74th minute in Argentina's 3-0 victory over Croatia in their semi-final match and in the 80th minute in their 2-1 victory over Australia in the Round of 16.  Palacios appeared in one of Argentina's three group stage matches, substituting on in the 69th minute in Argentina's second match against Mexico.

Personal life
Palacios initially was noticed by the media in August 2018 with his well publicized relationship with Instagram model Sol Pérez. It quickly became public though that around the same time Palacios and Pérez had started their relationship, Palacios had also begun dating amateur actress, singer, and dancer Juliana Orellano. Both Pérez and Orellano quickly ended their relationship with Palacios after finding out that he was dating the other. There was more drama however as on 21 August it became known that Palacios had been in relationship with a neighborhood friend Karen Gramajo, a manicurist, for four years. All three women angrily took to social media to protest Palacios' disloyalty.

Career statistics

Club

International

Honours
River Plate
 Copa Argentina: 2016–17, 2018–19
 Copa Libertadores: 2018
 Recopa Sudamericana: 2019

Argentina
 FIFA World Cup: 2022
 Copa América: 2021
 CONMEBOL–UEFA Cup of Champions: 2022

References

External links

1998 births
Living people
Association football midfielders
Argentine footballers
Argentina international footballers
Argentina youth international footballers
Argentina under-20 international footballers
2021 Copa América players
2022 FIFA World Cup players
Club Atlético River Plate footballers
Bayer 04 Leverkusen players
Argentine Primera División players
Bundesliga players
Argentine expatriate footballers
Argentine expatriate sportspeople in Germany
Expatriate footballers in Germany
Sportspeople from Tucumán Province
Copa América-winning players
Copa Libertadores-winning players
FIFA World Cup-winning players